Paolo Sassanelli (born 29 October 1958) is an Italian stage, film and television actor as well as director.

Life and career
Born  in Bari, Sassanelli made his stage debut in his hometown in the second half of the 1980s. He then moved to Rome and had his breakout in the early 1990s with the role of  Gabriele Serra in the TV-series Classe di ferro. In 2014, Sassanelli won the Nastro d'Argento for best supporting actor for his performance in the crime-comedy film Song'e Napule.
His short film debut Guerra (War) won as best fiction at The Palace International Short Film Festival, in 2010.

Selected filmography
 Colpo di luna (1995)
 Marriages (1998)
 Un medico in famiglia (TV, 1998-2014)
 Without Filter (2001)
 Compagni di scuola (TV, 2001)
 Now or Never (2003)
 The Life That I Want (2004)
 Red Like the Sky (2005)
 Codice rosso (TV, 2006)
 Last Minute Marocco (2007)
 Non pensarci (2007)
 Days and Clouds (2007)
 Giulia Doesn't Date at Night (2009)
 Ubaldo Terzani Horror Show (2010)
 Unlikely Revolutionaries (2010)
 Questo mondo è per te (2011)
 Make a Fake (2011)
 Paura (2012)
 Song'e Napule (2013)
 Ever Been to the Moon? (2015)
 Somewhere Amazing (2015)
 Youtopia (2018)
 Tuttapposto (2019)

Director
 Uerra (War), 2009, short film
 Ammore (Love), 2013, short film
 Two Little Italians, 2018

References

External links
 

1958 births
20th-century Italian male actors
21st-century Italian male actors
Italian male film actors
Italian male television actors
Italian male stage actors
People from Bari
Living people
Nastro d'Argento winners